Anyi may refer to:

Anyin language, spoken principally in Côte d'Ivoire and in Ghana
Anyi people
Anyi County, in Nanchang, Jiangxi, China
Wang Anyi
A capital of the Xia dynasty